Mount Koroyanitu, also known as Mount Evans is the fourth highest peak in Fiji and located in the Evans Ranges in the Western Division of the island of Viti Levu. It is 1195 meters or 3920 feet high. Koroyanitu in Fijian means "Village of the Devil".

It lies between the two main towns of Fiji's west namely Nadi and Lautoka.

A  area covering Mount Koroyanitu and the Vaturu Dam catchment is the Koroyanitu/Vaturu Important Bird Area. It supports a population of vulnerable Shy Ground-dove and near threatened Masked shining parrot.

The Koroyanitu Heritage Park covers the mountain and surrounding area, protecting an area of 35 km2. It was created in 1989, and is managed by the community in Ba, which lies northeast of the mountain.

References

Koroyanitu
Viti Levu
Important Bird Areas of Fiji